There have been 16 monarchs of the Principality of Liechtenstein since 1608. The current Prince of Liechtenstein is Hans-Adam II, since 13 November 1989. The current Hereditary Prince and Regent of Liechtenstein is Alois, since 15 August 2004.

Monarchs of Liechtenstein

Family tree
The names in bold signify official reigning monarchs of Liechtenstein.

See also

 Monarchy of Liechtenstein
 List of princesses of Liechtenstein
 Succession to the Liechtensteiner throne
 House of Liechtenstein
 Ducal hat of Liechtenstein
 2008 Liechtenstein tax affair

References

External links

 The Princely House of Liechtenstein (official site)

Liechtenstein, Princes
List of Princes of Liechtenstein
Liechtenstein